Baruch Simon is an Orthodox rabbi and rosh yeshiva at Yeshiva University in Washington Heights, Manhattan, New York. His formal title is the Colonel Jehiel R. Elyachar Professor of Talmud.  Prior to giving shiur in MYP, he was faculty at the Isaac Breuer College of Hebraic Studies at Yeshiva University.

Biography
Simon graduated from the Yeshiva University High School for Boys and continued on to graduate magna cum laude, with a B.A. in Judaic Studies from Yeshiva College.  He was chosen to deliver the Birkat Preidah, or farewell address, a singular honor given in the Yeshiva Program. Harav Simon was a fellow of the prestigious Caroline and Joseph S. Gruss Kollel Elyon and a fellow of the Katz Kollel.

Simon is the author of a sefer of divrei torah on the parsha entitled Imrei Baruch, which has been published in numerous volumes. He published his first volume of Imrei Baruch on Halakhah, which discusses the laws of eiruvin and reshuyos in 2009. He published a volume of Imrei Baruch on Minhagim in 2015.

A loyal talmid of Rabbi Hershel Schachter, he lives with his wife, Melanie, and their four children in Washington heights.

His shiur is known for its extensive use of packets containing as many as forty different torah sources per packet.

Simon has given thousands of shiurim, mostly at Yeshiva University,  and has over four thousand shiurim published on YUTorah.org These speeches cover topics such as Talmud, Jewish Law, ethical discourses and weekly Torah sermons.

References

Living people
Yeshiva University alumni
Yeshiva University rosh yeshivas
Year of birth missing (living people)